Graham Lewis (born Edward Graham Lewis, 22 February 1953) is an English musician.

Lewis is the bassist with punk rock/post-punk band Wire, a band formed in 1976.

Biography
On Wire's first studio album Graham Lewis was credited as Lewis; he continued to be known by this abbreviation; however some subsequent record credits give his full name.

He worked on other music projects, such as Dome (with fellow Wire member B.C. Gilbert), Duet Emmo (a portmanteau of "Dome" combined with Daniel Miller, founder of "Mute" records)  P'o, Kluba Cupol, Ocsid (with Jean-Louis Huhta), Where Everything Falls Out (with Kenneth Cosimo and Anna Livia Löwendahl-Atomic), He Said Omala, and Halo. His solo projects have been He Said and Hox.

With bandmate Matthew Simms, Mike Watt (Minutemen) and Bob Lee (The Black Gang), Lewis formed FITTED and released their first album First Fits in November 2019.

Graham studied textiles at Middlesex Polytechnic in London in the early seventies. He later switched to fashion but formed the band before he was able to have a substantial career in this world. The time at art school was very influential on his later music as he was able to go and see a range of bands (usually pub bands) including Kilburn and the High Roads, Ramones, Dr Feelgood etc.

Lewis lives in Uppsala, Sweden.

References

1953 births
English bass guitarists
English male guitarists
Male bass guitarists
Living people
People from Grantham
Wire (band) members